The 1981 PBA Reinforced Filipino Conference Finals was the best-of-5 basketball championship series of the 1981 PBA Reinforced Filipino Conference, and the conclusion of the conference's playoffs.

The Crispa Redmanizers captured their 9th PBA title with a 3–1 series win against the U/Tex Wranglers.

Qualification

Games summary

Game 1

The Redmanizers outscored the Wranglers, 33–18 in the second quarter to take a 62–45 lead at halftime. Crispa kept U/Tex at a 15-point distance in the first seven minutes of play in the third period before Bogs Adornado and Lim Eng Beng scored successively from the field to get the Wranglers to within seven points, 73–80. The Wranglers threaten once more in the final quarter with Leroy Jackson, Adornado and Lim combined for 26 points but Abet Guidaben scored twice to stop their rally as Crispa leads, 110–99. U/Tex kept on fighting back with a 9–2 run, Al Green's basket was countered by a three-point goal from Ricky Pineda to trim the lead further at 108–112, luckily for the Redmanizers, time has run out on U/Tex, Green made a charity from Jackson's backcourt foul for the final count.

Game 2

The Wranglers trailed for most part of the first half, reversed the trend in the second half and even led by eight points, 89–81, Freddie Hubalde spark a rally for Crispa that tied the count for the last time at 91–all, Wranglers' import Leroy Jackson came up with the key points in the last two minutes of play, after he put U/Tex back on top, Hubalde missed tying the game when he muffed an easy layup, Jackson scored on a fastbreak hit that iced the game for U/Tex with 10 seconds left.

Game 3

Al Green, coming out of the bench in the last four minutes, tallied two three-point plays against Leroy Jackson to give Crispa a 114–108 margin, the Wranglers fell behind by 14 points in the first half and 13 in the final period. Bogs Adornado shot the last six of his 34 points in a U/Tex rally that cut down Crispa's lead to two, 101–103. It was then when Green made the first of his three-point plays.

Game 4

A 23–10 run by Crispa in the second quarter with Atoy Co catching fire, gave them leads by 15 points, 52–37, the Wranglers fought back to within eight points at halftime, 55–63. The Redmanizers had entered penalty situation midway in the third quarter, Leroy Jackson got away with 16 points, 10 of which came from the foul line, coach Baby Dalupan was so mad at the way officiating was going that he yelled at the referees during a U/Tex timeout. Crispa led by only one, 91–90, at the end of the first 36 minutes of play. In the final quarter, the Wranglers, starring Jackson and Jimmy Noblezada, grabbed the lead and held it several times, the last at 105–103, gutsy plays gave the Redmanizers a 109–106 lead before Philip Cezar made a clever move that caused Adornado to charge into him for an offensive foul and Adornado's sixth foul to bowed out in the ballgame, a 7–4 burst gave Crispa a comfortable 119–114 edge with less than two minutes remaining.

Rosters

Broadcast notes

References

1981
1981 PBA season
Crispa Redmanizers games
U/Tex Wranglers games
PBA Reinforced Filipino Conference Finals